Sitka Seaplane Base  is a public use seaplane base owned by and  located in Sitka, a city and borough in the U.S. state of Alaska. It is included in the National Plan of Integrated Airport Systems for 2011–2015, which categorized it as a general aviation facility. This seaplane base is located near the Sitka Rocky Gutierrez Airport.

As per Federal Aviation Administration records, the airport had 32 passenger boardings (enplanements) in calendar year 2008, 22 enplanements in 2009, and 41 in 2010.

Facilities and aircraft
Sitka Seaplane Base has one seaplane landing area designated NW/SE with a water surface measuring 4,000 by 200 feet (1,219 x 61 m). It is located on the Sitka Channel, between Japonski Island and Baranof Island.

For the 12-month period ending December 31, 2006, the airport had 4,750 aircraft operations, an average of 13 per day: 84% air taxi and 16% general aviation. At that time there were 9 aircraft based at this airport, all single-engine.

Airlines and destinations
The following airline service is subsidized by the United States Department of Transportation via the Essential Air Service program.

See also
 Sitka Rocky Gutierrez Airport at coordinates

References

External links

 Harris Air
 Topographic map from USGS The National Map

Airports in Sitka, Alaska
Seaplane bases in Alaska